Grant Young (born January 5, 1964) was the drummer for the alternative rock band Soul Asylum from 1984–1995. He replaced Pat Morley shortly after the release of Soul Asylum's debut album, Say What You Will, Clarence...Karl Sold the Truck in 1984. Young's last appearance on a Soul Asylum record album was the breakthrough album, Grave Dancers Union. He was replaced in the middle of the recording sessions by Sterling Campbell, who has also since left the band and is primarily associated with David Bowie, as part of his touring bands.

Young has said that he played on five or six of the songs on the album. He did not, however, record on the band's biggest hit, "Runaway Train" (recorded by Campbell) but did initially play it with Soul Asylum in concerts.

Young was born in Iowa City, Iowa. After his departure from the band, he and his wife Catherine owned and operated a resort in the Boundary Waters region near Ely, Minnesota, close to the Canada–US border. After selling the resort, the two operated a retail business in Ely, but have since divorced, and moved back to the Twin Cities. They have one daughter together.

Discography with Soul Asylum

 Made to Be Broken (Twin/Tone 1986)
 Time's Incinerator  Twin/Tone
 While You Were Out (1986)
 Hang Time (A&M 1988)
 And the Horse They Rode in On (A&M 1990)
 Grave Dancers Union (Columbia 1992)

References

External links
Young's Resort

1964 births
Living people
Musicians from Iowa City, Iowa
Columbia Records artists
People from Ely, Minnesota
20th-century American drummers
American male drummers
Soul Asylum members
20th-century American male musicians